Adelard, Adalhard, or Adalard was briefly the Duke of Spoleto from March to August 824. Before Spoleto, he was the count of the palace. He was appointed to succeed Suppo I, but he died five months later and was replaced by Suppo's son Mauring.

Sources
Wickham, Chris. Early Medieval Italy: Central Power and Local Society 400-1000. MacMillan Press: 1981.

824 deaths
Dukes of Spoleto
Year of birth unknown